The 1952 Copa del Generalísimo Juvenil was the second staging of the tournament. The competition began on April 28, 1952, and ended on May 25, 1952, with the final.

First round

|}

Valencia qualified with more corners.

Second round

|}

Lleida qualified with more corners.

Quarterfinals

|}

Semifinals

|}

Semifinals Replay

|}

Final

|}

Copa del Rey Juvenil de Fútbol
Juvenil